Janhit College of Law (JCL)  is a law college in Greater Noida, Uttar Pradesh, India. This institution is affiliated to CCS University, Meerut, and is approved by Bar Council of India. JCL offers five-year integrated courses in B.A. LL.B., and a three-year LL.B. course.

History 
It was founded by Mr. Narendra Chaudhary, Founder and Secretary of Janhit College of Law, in 2002. It was the only law college in Greater Noida at the time. In its first year, it had only 50 students and now its imparting education to more than a thousand students.

Courses 

JCL offers following courses - LL.B. (3 years), B.A. LL.B (5 years), B. Ed. JCL is one of the first law colleges to offer the integrated degree course of B.A. LL.B. and LL.B. (3 years) course is made available to candidates from all professions and age groups.

Infrastructure

Library 
The library of the group is stocked with text books, foundation books for supplementary reading as per the BCI norms and CCS University norms. The library subscribes to more popular magazines and daily newspapers. JCL has its own library. Text books, reference books, law journals and books of general interest cater to the needs of the faculty and the students.

Sports 
Sporting and physical activities are promoted amongst students. Students are encouraged to participate in various sports like cricket, badminton, table tennis, volleyball, and chess.athletics

Extra-curricular events 
The extra-curricular committee seeks to expose JCL students to a variety of activities, which provide a platform for their overall development. These activities such as quiz competitions, workshops, seminars, debates, role-plays, extempore, dance and singing competitions to enhance their skills and bring their latent talent to the fore.

Human rights and women rights cell 
Janhit College of Law has established a human rights and women rights cell.

Other facilities 
 Conference Hall
 Auditorium
 The Legal Aid and Advise Clinic
 Moot Court Society
 Wi-Fi Campus

Moot court 

A moot court is an extracurricular activity at many law schools in which participants take part in simulated court proceedings, which usually involves drafting briefs (or memorials) and participating in oral argument. At Janhit College of Law, Law Students regularly participate in moot court practices. The main object of Moot Court at Janhit College of Law is to provide an opportunity to its students to prepare and present a legal argument and have practical knowledge as far as possible the lawyering process.

References

External links 
 

Law schools in Uttar Pradesh
Universities and colleges in Noida
Educational institutions established in 2002
2002 establishments in Uttar Pradesh
Educational institutions in India with year of establishment missing